Jaci Clement is a media expert with more than 20 years experience in the communications industry. She is chief executive officer and executive director of the Fair Media Council, which advocates for quality news and works to create a media-savvy society in a media-driven world. FMC is headquartered on Long Island, New York.

Clement writes weekly media commentary and analysis and is regularly interviewed on issues affecting local news and the subsequent impact on the news consumer; frequently contributes opinion pieces on the topic to a variety of publications, and speaks around the country on the importance of being a media savvy consumer. She has created a media literacy program and brought it into the classroom, believing strongly that news literacy and literacy skills must develop simultaneously to enhance children's deductive reasoning and critical thinking abilities and, ultimately, to create a generation of world-class citizens.

Her news experience began when she was in the fourth grade, when she earned her first byline in a daily newspaper. She worked as a reporter while attending college, in addition to being a stringer for The New York Times''' education section and serving as editor in chief of her college newspaper, The Chronicle, which was highly regarded as one of the best college newspapers in the country. While still a reporter at The Chronicle, she wrote an investigative news article that forced the resignation of a tenured university professor.

Her background in reporting and editing is complemented by extensive experience working on the business side of newspapers, including internal communications, marketing, advertising, circulation and research. Prior to her current position at FMC, she was an executive with Dolan Media, based in Minneapolis, Minn., and Times Mirror Co.

She holds the title of Executive Communicator, the highest rank of distinction bestowed by the Association for Women in Communications.  In 2007, she was invited to participate in a project to shape the newsroom of the future, which was sponsored by the Media Giraffe Project, a research initiative housed within the University of Massachusetts Amherst, journalism program. She was a regular panelist on 21 Forum, a talk show produced by PBS affiliate WLIW New York. She has received the Media Advocate of the Year Award from the Long Island Association, Distinguished Service Award from the Advancement for Commerce, Industry and Technology (ACIT) and Top 50 Women on Long Island AWard from Long Island Business News. (Since heading FMC, Clement declines awards from media.)

She has served as an adjunct professor of journalism at Hofstra University, a member of the advisory board of Media Ethics Magazine'', published by the University of Illinois at Urbana-Champaign, and a member of the board of Bethpage Federal Credit Union. She is a member of the National Press Club and London-based The Media Society.

She was born in Youngstown, Ohio and received a B.A. degree in communication arts from Hofstra University.

References

External links
 Media Ethics Magazine 
 Bethpage Federal Credit Union 
 Fair Media Council 
 Media Savvy by Jaci Clement 

American mass media scholars
Year of birth missing (living people)
Living people